Etzelwang is a municipality in the district of Amberg-Sulzbach in Bavaria in Germany.

History
Etzelwang has existed as a parish since the second half of the 11th century. However, the present municipality of Etzelwang was not created until the Bavarian administrative reforms of 1972 to 1975. It was created from the political units of Neidstein, Kirchenreinbach, and Schmidtstadt.

Name
Etzel comes from the same root as Heinrich or English Henry. It is not certain which Heinrich gave his name to the parish and subsequently to the municipality. It is possible that it refers to Holy Roman Emperor Heinrich II, who founded the bishopric of Bamberg, to which the parish belonged.

Sights
Places of interest in Etzelwang include the following:

Schloss Neidstein, a castle once owned by actor Nicolas Cage.
St. Nikolaus church
The church was originally dedicated in 1059, but subsequently destroyed. The present church was built from 1721 to the completion of the tower in 1763.
Ruins of Burg Hauseck
Neutras cliffs
Burg Rupprechtstein
Hofmark of Kirchenreinbach
Church of St. Ulrich in Kirchereinbach

References

Amberg-Sulzbach